Vitalii is a masculine given name of Ancient Rome origin. In ancient Rome it was a nickname, there was also a related cognomen (generic nickname) Vitalianus, which literally translates as "Vitalii`s belonging to Vitalii". The female version of the name is Vitalina

The name Vіtalіi came to Kievan Rus with Christianity from Byzantium. According to V. A. Nikonov, in 1988 the name in the USSR was rare.

Male diminutives include Vitalik, Vitalenka, Vital, Vitalia, Vitasia, Vitulik, Talii, Talik, Talia; female: Vita, Vitalinka, Vitalia, Vitasia, Vitasha, Vitakha, Lina, Talina, Tal.

People known as Vitalii 

 Vitalii Demianiuk (born 1971), Ukrainian engineer and philanthropist
 Vitalii Klychko (born 1971), Ukrainian boxer and politician
 Vitalii Masol (1928–2018), former Prime Minister of Ukraine (headed the government: July 1987 – October 1990)
 Vitalii Mykolenko (born 1999), Ukrainian footballer
 Vitaly Portnikov (born 1967), Ukrainian editor and journalist
 Vitalii Sediuk (born 1988), Ukrainian prankster and former media reporter

Name-day

Christianity 

 Catholic Church: January 9, February 14, April 2, April 21, April 28, July 2, July 10, August 29, September 1, September 22, October 16, October 20, November 3, November 4.
 Orthodox Church: New Julian calendar — January 25, April 22, April 28, July 23; Julian calendar — February 7, May 5, May 11, August 5.

See also 

 Vitali

References 

Russian masculine given names
Ukrainian masculine given names